Tulun is a town in Irkutsk Oblast, Russia, located on the river Iya (Angara's basin),  northwest of Irkutsk. Population:

History
It was founded in the second half of the 18th century as a village in the Iya Valley. With the construction of the Trans-Siberian Railway in the early 20th century, Tulun grew into an important trade center. It was administrated as a town between 1922 and 1924, before being granted town status permanently in 1927.

Administrative and municipal status
Within the framework of administrative divisions, Tulun serves as the administrative center of Tulunsky District, even though it is not a part of it. As an administrative division, it is incorporated separately as the Town of Tulun—an administrative unit with the status equal to that of the districts.   As a municipal division, the Town of Tulun is incorporated as Tulun Urban Okrug.

Climate
Tulun has a subarctic climate (Köppen Dfc) with mild to warm, humid summers and severely cold, drier winters. Sunshine is generous and the area receives 2,237 hours of bright sunshine annually.

Economy and infrastructure
The town is a center for timber and brown coal production. The Azeysky and Tulunsky open cut coal mines are located nearby and there is an associated hydrolysis plant in the town.

References

Notes

Sources

External links
Unofficial website of Tulun 
Pictures of Tulun

Cities and towns in Irkutsk Oblast
Irkutsk Governorate